Salman may refer to:

People
 Salman (name), people with the name

Places in Iran
 Salman, Khuzestan, a village in Khuzestan Province
 Salman, alternate name of Deh-e Salman, Lorestan, a village in Lorestan Province
 Salman, Razavi Khorasan, a village in Razavi Khorasan Province
 Salman, alternate name of Salami, Iran, a city in Razavi Khorasan Province
 Salman, Semnan, a village in Semnan Province
 Salman, Tehran, a village in Tehran Province
 Salman, Zanjan, a village in Zanjan Province

Other
 Salman (myth), a god worshipped in pre-Islamic southern Arabia

See also

 
 David S. Weiss, Salman on the Dennis Miller radio show
 Salmon, fish species
 Salmon (disambiguation)
 Solomon (disambiguation)